13th Brigade or 13th Infantry Brigade may refer to:

Infantry units
 13th Demi-Brigade of Foreign Legion, France
 13th Indian Infantry Brigade, a unit of the British Indian Army in WWII
 13th Infantry Brigade (Hungary)
13th Light Brigade (Netherlands)
XIII International Brigade, Spain
 13th Infantry Brigade (United Kingdom)
 13th Infantry Brigade (United States)

Cavalry units
 13th Cavalry Brigade (British Indian Army), a unit of the British Indian Army in WWI, distinct from the one below
 13th Indian Cavalry Brigade, a unit of the British Indian Army in WWI

Other units
 13th Brigade (Australia)
 13th Brigade (Japan)
13th Light Tank Brigade, Soviet Union
 XIII Brigade, Royal Horse Artillery, United Kingdom
 13th Mounted Brigade, United Kingdom

See also
 13th Army (disambiguation)
 13th Division (disambiguation)
 13th Group (disambiguation)
 13th Battalion (disambiguation)
 13 Squadron (disambiguation)